Waukegan High School, or WHS, is a public four-year high school located in Waukegan, Illinois, USA, a city to the north of Chicago, Illinois. It is part of Waukegan Community Unit School District 60. Students attend classes at the Washington Campus (EAST Campus), located at 1011 Washington Street, and also at the Brookside Campus (WEST Campus), at 2325 Brookside Avenue.

History 
WHS first opened its doors in 1870 with the original building the aforementioned Washington Campus. From this point up to the construction of Brookside Campus, it was known as the Waukegan Township High School. Brookside Campus was built to accommodate the baby boomer generation after WWII and opened in 1974. Brookside Campus originally held the Freshmen and Sophomore classes, while Washington Campus housed the Junior and Senior classes. Between the 1975–76 school year, and the 1989–90 school year, Waukegan High School split into two completely separate campuses. The East (Washington) campus is considered to be one and the same as the current and previous Waukegan High School. The West (Brookside) Campus was, during those years, a separate high school known as Waukegan West. After 1990, the two campuses combined, with Washington Campus becoming a 9th grade center, while Brookside Campus became a 10th–12th grade center. One small development of the two schools combining was the new mascot, a bulldog with an eye-patch. The eye-patch is an homage to Waukegan West's mascot: a raider.

After the 2004 school year, a new program called "Houses" was created, with the goals of creating smaller learning environments for the student body, and allowing for those students to learn with like-minded people. All even number houses up to eight were located at Washington Campus, while all odd-numbered houses up to seven were located at Brookside Campus. Each house contained their own principal, dean, secretary, and several counselors. The program ended by the 2017–2018 school year, and instead a change was opted where Brookside Campus became a 9th–10th grade learning center, while Washington Campus became an 11th–12th grade learning center.

Today, it is one of the largest high schools in the United States.

Demographics 
According to the Illinois School Report Card for 2018, the demographics are as follow: 79.2% Hispanic, 13% Black, 3.5% White, 1.6% Asian, 1.7% Two or More Races, 0.8% American Indian, and 0.2% Pacific Islander.

Feeder Schools

Public schools

Athletics 
The Waukegan Bulldogs are members of the North Suburban Conference.  They also compete as a part of the Illinois High School Association (IHSA), which sponsors the state tournaments for most of the sports and activities in the state.

During the time when Waukegan High School was split into Waukegan East and Waukegan West High Schools, East retained the "Bulldog" nickname that had been in use, while the West school took the name "Raiders".  When the schools merged again, the traditional Bulldog name was retained, however, a pirate's eye patch was added to depictions of the bulldog to honor the "Raiders" legacy of the West campus.

Waukegan sponsors the following interscholastic athletic teams for men and women: 

Badminton
Baseball
Basketball
Bowling
Cheerleading
Cross Country
Football
Golf

Soccer
Softball
Swimming
Tennis
Track and Field
Volleyball
Wrestling
While not sponsored by the IHSA, the school also sponsors teams in pom poms for women, and coed teams in drill team and rifle team.

The following teams have finished in the top four of their respective state championship tournaments, sponsored by the IHSA:

 Baseball:  2nd place (1959–60);  State Champions (1970–71, 1982–83)
 Basketball (boys):  4th place (1958–59);  2nd place (2008–09); 3rd place (2009–10)
 Cross Country (boys):  3rd place (1993–94)
 Golf (boys): 4th place (1939–40);  3rd place (1957–58);  2nd place (1953–54, 1962–63, 1963–64, 1969–70)
 Golf (girls):  4th place (1976–77, 1977–78, 1983–84);  3rd place (1992–93);  2nd place (1981–82);  State Champions (1975–76, 1980–81, 1991–92)
 Track & Field (boys):  4th place (1926–27);  3rd place (1982–83, 1989–90);  2nd place (1953–54);  State Champions (1979–80)
 Track & Field (girls):  3rd place (1994–95);  2nd place (1995–96)
 Wrestling:  4th place (1953–54, 1960–61, 1991–92, 1993–94, 2000–01); 3rd place (1956–57, 1958–59, 1959–60, 1964–65, 1969–70, 1971–72, 1981–82);  2nd place (1950–51, 1951–52, 1961–62, 1990–91);  State Champions (1957–58, 1962–63, 1963–64, 1965–66)

The 1982–83 baseball state title, the 1983–84 4th-place finish in girls golf, and the 1989–90 3rd-place finish in boys track & field were won by Waukegan West High School.  The IHSA recognizes the current Waukegan High School as the caretaker of these victories.

The Purple, The Green, The Gold (Fight Song) 
Also known as the School Song, or Purple, Green, and Gold, it was originally composed by Otto E. Graham in 1959. The lyrics are:

Notable alumni

 Paul Adams was an Illinois Fighting Illini football player and long-time coach at Deerfield High School.
 Robert Barnett is a lawyer whose clients have included Bill Clinton, Hillary Clinton, and Barack Obama.
 Gary Bennett (class of 1990) was a Major League Baseball catcher (1995–2008).  He was a member of the 2006 World Series Champion St. Louis Cardinals.
 Jack Benny (did not graduate) was a vaudevillian, comedian, and star of radio, film, and television from the 1920s through the 1960s.
 Jim Bittermann has been a news reporter based in Europe since 1980 for NBC, ABC, and most recently CNN.
 Nick Browder was a quarterback in the Arena Football League.
 Corky Calhoun was a professional basketball player (1972–80), member of 1977 NBA Champion Portland Trail Blazers.
 Sam Cunningham, mayor of Waukegan (2017–2021)
 Betty Currie was the personal secretary for President Bill Clinton, best known for her testimony in the Monica Lewinsky affair.
 Johnny Dickshot was a Major League Baseball player (Pittsburgh Pirates, New York Giants, Chicago White Sox).
 Neil Flynn is an actor best known for his work on the television series Scrubs and The Middle.
 Otto Graham was a professional football player (1946–55), playing his entire career as quarterback for the Cleveland Browns; he is a member of the Pro Football Hall of Fame.
 Jon Michael Hill is an American actor. He is best known for his role as Detective Damon Washington in the ABC police drama, Detroit 1-8-7 and currently co-stars as Detective Marcus Bell in the CBS series Elementary.
Charles Kupperman, Deputy U.S. National Security Advisor.
 Jermaine Lewis was a professional football player in the Arena Football League.
 Joshua Mallett, better known by his stage name "Rip", is a recording artist, producer, DJ and filmmaker
 Rashaan Melvin is a cornerback for the NFL's Carolina Panthers
 Bob O'Farrell was a Major League Baseball catcher (1915–35), voted the National League's 1926 Most Valuable Player and played for the 1926 World Series champion St. Louis Cardinals.
 David Ogrin is a professional golfer.
 Jerry Orbach was an actor noted for roles on stage, television, and film; won a Tony Award for his work on Broadway and starred in the NBC television series Law & Order.
 Adam Pearce (class of 1996) was a World Champion and Hall of Fame professional wrestler, currently serving as WWE's resident on-screen official.
 Jereme Richmond, basketball player for University of Illinois, declared for NBA Draft in 2011.
 Bryan W. Simon is a stage and film director.
 Brian Traxler is a former MLB player (Los Angeles Dodgers).
 Jerome Whitehead was a professional basketball player in the NBA (1978–89); member of the national champion 1976-77 Marquette Warriors men's basketball team.
 Renae Youngberg played in the All-American Girls Professional Baseball League.

References

External links
 Official Waukegan High School Site

Public high schools in Illinois
Waukegan, Illinois
Schools in Lake County, Illinois